Yavatmal ( is a city and municipal council in the Indian state of Maharashtra. It is the administrative headquarters of Yavatmal District. The name is derived from the Marathi Yavat (mountain) and mal (row).

History

Formerly known as "Yeoti" or "Yeotmal", Yavatmal was the main town of the Berar Sultanate and according to old writings "the safest place in the world". The then region of Yavatmal (now Yavatmal district), was part of the dominion of Aladdin Hassan Bahman Shah who founded the Bahmani Sultanate in 1347. In 1572, Murtaza Shah, ruler of the Ahmadnagar Sultanate (current day Ahmadnagar District), annexed the Yavatmal district. In 1596, Chand Bibi, warrior queen of Ahmadnagar, ceded the district of Yavatmal to the Mughal Empire, then rulers of a large part of India. Following the death of the sixth Mughal Emperor Aurangzeb in 1707, Yavatmal was passed on to the Maratha Empire. When Raghoji I Bhonsle became ruler of the Nagpur kingdom in 1783, he included the Yavatmal district in his territory. After the British East India Company created Berar Province in 1853, Yavatmal became part of East Berar District in 1863 and later part of the South East Berar district—both districts of the Central Provinces and Berar. Yavatmal remained part of Madhya Pradesh until the 1956 reorganization of states when it was transferred to the Bombay State. With the creation of the Maharashtra state on 1 May 1960, Yavatmal district became a part of the same.

Yavatmal Municipal Council was constituted in 1869 but was dissolved shortly thereafter. It was established again in 1894 and thus forms the oldest municipal council in the district. Mr. Eliot was first mayor and Lieutenant, W. Hege was deputy mayor. Govind Punaji Bari was the first Indian president of the Yavatmal Municipal council (02-Jan-1914 to 31 May 1932). The first elections conducted for the position of president of municipal council were held on 22 December 1934. Prior to that the same was appointed.

The mini-train called Shakuntala is a historic remark built by the British government to transport cotton which is now closed.

Demographics
As of 2011 Indian Census, Yavatmal had a total population of 116,551, of which 58,549 were males and 58,002 were females. The population within the age group of 0 to 6 years was 11,360. The total number of literates in Yavatmal was 96,726, which constituted 82.9% of the population with male literacy of 85.1% and female literacy of 80.9%. The effective literacy rate of 7+ population of Yavatmal was 91.9%, of which the male literacy rate was 94.8% and the female literacy rate was 89.1%. The Scheduled Castes and Scheduled Tribes population was 19,816 and 6,543 respectively. Yavatmal had 26,173 households in 2011.

Language
The principal language of the Yavatmal district is Marathi however Varhadi dialect of Marathi majorly spoken by people of Yavatmal. However, since the district has numerous Scheduled and Nomadic Tribes, other languages such as Gormati or Banjari, Gondi, Urdu, Telugu and Kolami are also spoken in parts of the district. In 1973, the Marathi Sahitya Sammelan (Marathi Literature Conference) was hosted in the city for the first time which was presided over by Gajanan Digambar Madgulkar. The second time, it was hosted on 11 January 2019 chaired by Vaishali Yende, widow of a suicide victim farmer, to highlight the issue of farmer suicides in the area.

Culture

Yavatmal is known for its unique Navratri festival celebration, the whole city is known for organizing huge celebration events for Navratri. Festivals like Gudi Padwa, Diwali, Dussehra, Christmas, Easter Sunday and almost all Hindu and  Christian occasions are celebrated. The district is also home to a Buddhist community.

Climate
This city has a tropical climate. The Köppen-Geiger climate classification is Aw. In Yavatmal, the average annual temperature is 26.8 °C. The rainfall here averages 946 mm.

Economy

During British rule, Yavatmal city was classified as a hill station. Major business establishments in Yavatmal include the Raymond UCO mill that produces denim fabrics for jeans. There are establishments related to the cotton, and textile industries. There is a  textile Special Economic Zone (SEZ) under construction while HLL Unilever has also decided to restart the plant they currently have in the city. Other local businesses in the town are dominated by the presence of agricultural supply facilities used by the nearby farming community.

Banking services are available in the Yavatmal, Arni, Ner, Pusad, Digras, Ghatanji and Kelapur(Pandharkawada) and Wani areas.

The major industrial centres are at: MIDC Lohara, Darwha, Digras, Pusad, Umerkhed, Wani, Umari, Kelapur , Ralegaon and Babhulgaon, Ner, and Wani-Maregaon with the main market places in: Yavatmal City, Arni, Wani, Darwha, Digras, Ghatanji, Mohada, Pusad, Umerkhed and Kelapur.

Transport

Roads
New Shaktipith Expressway will pass through Yavatmal city and disctrict Nagpur-Yavatmal-Goa Express 
 The National Highway NH 44 (Varanasi–Kanyakumari) passes through the district at Vadki, Karanji, Pandharkawada, Patanbori, and Kelapur.
 New National Highway is been proposed from Khandwa(MP)- Dharni-Amravati-Yavatmal-Karanji on NH 44. 
 The state highway (Amravati–Chandrapur) passes through Ner, Yavatmal, Jodmoha, Mohada, Umari, Karanji and Wani.
 The (Nagpur–Tuljapur) National highway 361 passes through Kalamb, Yavatmal, Arni, and Umarkhed. 
 Mumbai–Nagpur Expressway will directly connect to Yavatmal City with feeder roads.

Railways
 Yavatmal is the southern terminus of the  narrow gauge railway known locally as the Shakuntala Railway. This line is composed of two legs intersecting with the  Broad gauge Howrah-Nagpur-Mumbai line at Murtijapur – the  northern leg to Achalpur and the  southeastern leg to Yavatmal. Darwha Station lies on this line.
Another line, Majri–Mudkhed line, passes through the district. Wani is a railway station on this line. The state cabinet has approved Wardha–Nanded rail link project. This railway line will connect Wardha–Yavatmal in Vidarbha with Nanded in Marathwada.
 India's First broad-gauge Metro will run From Nagpur to Yavatmal on Nagpur-Wardha, Wardha-Yavatmal-Nanded line.
SURVEY REPORTS SUBMITTED TO BOARD for approval for new broad gauge line between Yavatmal-Adilabad Via Ghatanji, Pandharkawada, Chankha

Airport

International
Dr. Babasaheb Ambedkar International Airport, Nagpur is 150 km away From Yavatmal City.

Regional

Education
Prominent educational institutes:
Shri Vasantrao Naik Government Medical College
Technical: Government College of Engineering, Government Polytechnic, Government Residential Women's Polytechnic, Jawaharlal Darda Engineering and Technical Institute (private), Jagdamba College of Engineering,
Other: Amolakchand Mahavidyalaya (Science, Arts and Commerce), Babaji Datey Kala & Vanijya Mahavidyalaya (Arts and Commerce College), St. Aloysius English School

Notable people
 

Keshav Baliram Hedgewar,Founding Sarsanghachalak of the Rashtriya Swayamsevak Sangh
Aajibai Banarase, community leader and president of Maharashtra Mandal London.
 Vijay Darda, former MP (Rajya Sabha), Chairman Lokmat media Pvt. Ltd
 Jambuwantrao Dhote, politician and founder of Vidarbha Janata Congress
 Nachiket Mor, banker and National Director for Bill and Melinda Gates Foundation.
 Sudhakarrao Naik, former Chief Minister of Maharashtra.
 Vasantrao Naik, former Chief Minister of Maharashtra.
 Sanjay Rathod, former Guardian minister Yavatmal
 Manikrao Thakre, former President Maharashtra State Congress Committee
 Madan Madhukarrao Yerawar, former Guardian minister Yavatmal
 Wasudev Waman Patankar, Marathi poet and advocate (1908–1997)
 Akash Chikte, Indian field hockey player
 Suryakanta Patil, Indian politician
 Lalit Yadav, Vidharbha cricketer
 Alind Naidu, Vidharbha cricketer
 Ashok Uike, Former Minister of Tribal Development
 Vasant Purke, Politician and former Minister of Education 
 Jawaharlal Darda, Freedom Fighter
 Madhav Shrihari Aney (Loknayak Bapuji Aney [Padma Vibhushan]) Ardent educationist, freedom fighter, statesman, a modern Sanskrit poet and a politician
 Rajendra Darda, Politician
 Shivajirao Moghe, Former Minister of Social Justice in Maharashtra Cabinet
 Faheem Hussain, Pakistani physicist
 Harising Nasaru Rathod, Politician

See also
Rani Amravati
Make in Maharashtra

References

External links
Department of Agriculture and Cooperation, Ministry of agriculture of Government of India
List of Yavatmal Pincode .

Cities and towns in Yavatmal district
Talukas in Maharashtra
Cities in Maharashtra
Yavatmal